The following cemeteries were added to the National Register of Historic Places as part of the Civil War Era National Cemeteries Multiple Property Submission (or MPS).

References

National Register of Historic Places Multiple Property Submissions
Cemeteries on the National Register of Historic Places
Cemeteries